The Men's double FITA round C3,C6 was an archery competition in the 1984 Summer Paralympics.

The British archer, Philip Thorne won the gold medal unopposed.

Results

References

1984 Summer Paralympics events